The port of Brindisi is a port in Brindisi, Italy. It is used for tourism, commercial and industrial shipping on the Adriatic Sea. Tourist traffic offer connections with the Balkan Peninsula and Turkey, while commercial concerns include coal, fuel oil, natural gas, and chemicals. For more than two millennia, the harbour has been involved in military and commercial operations.

Passenger ferry destinations

 Vlorë, European Ferries-Ionian Sky and SHIPS Management-Galaxy
 Igoumenitsa, Grimaldi Lines

Shipping companies

 Adriatica di Navigazione Brindisi-Corfu-Igoumenitsa-Patrasso ed in passato anche per il Pireo, il Libano, Israele ed Alessandria D'Egitto
 Agoudimos Lines Brindisi-Corfu-Igoumenitsa-Paxos-Cefalonia-Zante-Patrasso
 Endeavor Lines Brindisi-Corfu-Igoumenitsa-Cefalonia-Zante-Patrasso
 European Sealines Brindisi-Corfu-Igoumenitsa-Paxos-Zante
 Hellenic Mediterrenean Lines Brindisi-Corfu-Igoumenitsa-Patasso ed in passato anche rotte per il Pireo
 Maritime way Brindisi-Corfu-Igoumenitsa-Cefalonia-Patrasso
 Minoan Lines Brindisi-Corfu-Igoumenitsa-Patrasso
 Fragline Brindisi-Corfu-Igoumenitsa
 Blue Star Ferries (Strintzis Lines) Brindisi-Corfu-Igoumenitsa
 Ventouris Ferries Brindisi-Corfu-Igoumenitsa
 European Sealines Brindisi-Corfu-Igoumenitsa e Brindisi-Corfu-Paxi-Zante
 Marmara Lines Brindisi - Çeşme
 Snav: catamarano Brindisi-Corfu-Paxos
 Harmonica Lines Brindisi-Igoumenitsa
 Med Link Lines Brindisi-Igoumenitsa-Patrasso-Cefalonia-Cesme
 European Seaways Brindisi-Corfù-Igoumenitsa
 Superferries Brindisi-Cesme
 Five stars Line Brindisi-Corfu-Igoumenitsa-Patrasso-Cefalonia
 Mega Stars Line Brindisi-Cesme
 Turkish Maritime Lines Brindisi-Cesme
 Delir Lines Brindisi-Igoumenitsa-Cesme
 Marlines Brindisi-corfù-Igoumenitsa-Patrasso
 Poseidon Lines Brindisi-Corfù-Igoumenitsa
 Adriatic Seaways Brindisi-Corfù-Igoumenitsa
 Access Ferries Brindisi-Igoumenitsa-Cesme
 Palmier Ferries Brindisi-Corfù-Paxi-Igoumenitsa
 Sancak Line Brindisi-Cesme
 Ga Ferries Brindisi-Corfù-Igoumenitsa-Patrasso-Cefalonia
 Ak Ventouris Brindisi-Igoumenitsa-Patrasso-Cefalonia
 Anatolia Ferries Brindisi-Igoumenitsa-Cesme
 Vergina Ferries Brindisi-Igoumenitsa-Patrasso-Cefalonia
 Illyria Lines Brindisi-Durazzo-Valona
 Azzurra Lines Bari-Brindisi-Durazzo
 Veronica Lines Brindisi-Valona
 Skenderbeg Lines Brindisi-Valona
 Rml Lines Brindisi-Igoumenitsa
 Nel Lines Brindisi-Corfù-Igoumenitsa-Cefalonia-Zante
 Prosperity Navigation Brindisi-Valona
 Ikaria Lines Brindisi-Valona
 Rainbow Lines Brindisi-Durazzo-Igoumenitsa
 South Lines Brindisi-Durazzo
 Far East Maritime Brindisi-Valona

References

Bibliography

External links

Official website

Ports and harbours of Italy
Transport in Brindisi